Bisutti is a surname. Notable people with the surname include:

 Danielle Bisutti (born 1976), American actress and singer
 Delia Bisutti (born 1947), Argentinian politician
 Kylie Bisutti (born 1990), American author and model
 María Aurelia Bisutti (1930–2010), Argentine actress